Dublin West is a parliamentary constituency represented in Dáil Éireann, the lower house of the Irish parliament or Oireachtas. The constituency elects 4 deputies (Teachtaí Dála, commonly known as TDs) on the system of proportional representation by means of the single transferable vote (PR-STV).

Boundaries

The constituency includes Mulhuddart, Corduff, Blanchardstown, Castleknock, Carpenterstown, Barberstown, Clonsilla and Ongar. The portion in Dublin City includes Dublin Zoo and Áras an Uachtaráin, the official residence of the President of Ireland.The Electoral (Amendment) (Dáil Constituencies) Act 2017 defines the constituency as:

TDs

Elections

2020 general election

2016 general election

2014 by-election
Following the resignation of Independent TD Patrick Nulty, a by-election was held on 23 May 2014, on the same day as the 2014 European and local elections.

2011 by-election
Following the death of Fianna Fáil TD Brian Lenihan Jnr, a by-election was held on 27 October 2011, on the same day as the Irish presidential election and two constitutional referendums.

2011 general election

2007 general election

2002 general election

1997 general election

1996 by-election
Following the death of Fianna Fáil TD Brian Lenihan Snr, a by-election was held on 2 April 1996. The seat was won by the Fianna Fáil candidate Brian Lenihan Jnr, son of the deceased TD.

1992 general election

1989 general election

1987 general election

November 1982 general election

1982 by-election
Following the resignation of Fine Gael TD Richard Burke on his appointment as European Commissioner, a by-election was held on 25 May 1982. The seat was won by the Fine Gael candidate Liam Skelly.

February 1982 general election

1981 general election

See also
Dáil constituencies
Elections in the Republic of Ireland
Politics of the Republic of Ireland
List of Dáil by-elections
List of political parties in the Republic of Ireland

References

Dáil constituencies
Parliamentary constituencies in County Dublin
Politics of Fingal
Politics of South Dublin (county)
1981 establishments in Ireland
Constituencies established in 1981